McConnell Dowell is a major infrastructure construction company founded in New Zealand in 1961. In 2003 it became a wholly owned subsidiary of Aveng, which is listed on the Johannesburg Stock Exchange in South Africa.

History
McConnell Dowell was formed in 1960 by two New Zealand engineers, Jim Dowell and Malcolm McConnell. It was involved in pipeline projects in New Zealand before expanding to Australia, Asia and the Middle East in the 1970s.

McConnell Dowell was listed on the New Zealand Stock Exchange in 1983 as part of the arrangements to take over Hamilton construction company Hawkins Holdings. During the remainder of the 1980s, McConnell Dowell also ventured outside of the engineering field int banking and finance, through shareholdings in National Insurance Company of New Zealand, National Pacific Corporation, Renouf Partners, Kupe and property development of the Robert Jones Tower in Auckland.

Following the 1987 stock market crash, McDonnell Dowell merged with Inter-Pacific Equity, an Australian investment bank, and sold off National Pacific to Government Life Insurance. Morrison-Knudsen (USA) took up 48.9% of McConnell Dowell in 1991, but in the mid-1990s sold its share to Dominion Bridge Corporation (Canada) who then held 63%. In 1999, Dominion Bridge sold its share to LTA Ltd (South Africa) which was acquired by Aveng the next year. Aveng acquired full ownership from the remaining minority shareholders in 2003 via a scheme of arrangement.

McConnell Dowell bought a majority interest in South Australian company Built Environs in 2008.

McConnell Dowell was one of the construction partners in Stronger Christchurch Infrastructure Rebuild Team which was responsible for rebuilding infrastructure in Christchurch following the 2011 Christchurch earthquake.

Major projects
Some of the major projects that McConnell Dowell has built include:
 ANZ Centre, Auckland, New Zealand
 Marsden Point Oil Refinery, New Zealand
 Te Mihi Power Station, New Zealand
 Barwon Heads Bridge, Victoria
 Beauty World MRT station, Singapore
 Marina Bay Cruise Centre Singapore
 O-Bahn Busway Adelaide Access Project, South Australia
 Barangaroo ferry wharf, Sydney
 Gold Coast Light Rail, Queensland
Chith Export Facility, Queensland
Port Capacity Project, Port of Melbourne, Victoria
Western Program Alliance, Victoria
South Tarawa main road from Betio to Bonriki

Safety
In the early 2010s, McConnell Dowell was accused of lacking safety culture, and encouraging workers to report injuries as having occurred in their own time to preserve clean injury reports to leverage getting future large contracts. It claims to have improved its safety practices significantly over the last 30 years.

Incidents

EPA vs Trevor Morgan 
In 1995, McConnell Dowell's CEO Trevor Morgan was found guilty of an offence in the Land and Environment Court of New South Wales. Morgan had signed a return which showed that McConnell Dowell had only rarely contravened the licence’s permitted pollution level when, in fact, there were many occasions the level was exceeded. Morgan was fined $4,000.

Woolloomoolloo oil spill 
In 2003 A pipeline was damaged at the Finger Wharf during construction works. In a court action initiated by the Environment Protection Authority against McConnell Dowell (found not guilty), Moltoni Corporation, a subcontractor working for McConnell Dowell in New South Wales was implicated for the discharge of oil into the waters of Woolloomooloo Bay. Moltoni was exonerated from any responsibility for damage to the pipeline and the consequent spillage.

References

Companies listed on the New Zealand Exchange
Construction and civil engineering companies established in 1961
Construction and civil engineering companies of New Zealand
New Zealand companies established in 1961